The Florida Public Service Commission (FPSC) regulates investor-owned electric, natural gas, and water and wastewater utilities. The FPSC facilitates competitive markets in the telecommunications industry, has authority over intercarrier disputes, and oversees pay telephones, the federal Lifeline Assistance Program and Telecommunications Relay Service.

Five commissioners serve staggered four-year terms on the FPSC. Commissioners are appointed by the Governor of Florida and confirmed by the Florida Senate. The FPSC Chairman is elected by his/her fellow commissioners to serve a two-year term. Current commissioners include Chairman Andrew Giles Fay, Art Graham, Gary F. Clark, Mike La Rosa, and Gabriella Passidomo.

FPSC Mission: The Florida Public Service Commission is committed to making sure that Florida's consumers receive some of their most essential services — electric, natural gas, telephone, water, and wastewater — in a safe, reasonable, and reliable manner. In doing so, the PSC exercises regulatory authority over utilities in one or more of three key areas: rate base/economic regulation; competitive market oversight; and monitoring of safety, reliability, and service.

History 
Created by the Florida Legislature in 1887, the FPSC was originally called the Florida Railroad Commission and primarily regulated railroad passenger and freight rates and operations.  As Florida grew, the Commission's purpose expanded.

1887 -  Florida Railroad Commission was established, Chapter 3746
1891 - Repeal of Chapter 4068, abolishing the Florida Railroad Commission
1897 - Enactment of Chapter 4700, re-establishing the Florida Railroad Commission
1899 - First decision issued. Affirmed Atlantic, Valdosta and Western Railway the right to enter and use Jacksonville Union Terminal
1911 -  Jurisdiction over telephone services added
1929 -  Jurisdiction over motor carrier transportation added
1947 -  Name changed to Florida Railroad and Public Utilities Commission
1951 - Jurisdiction over investor-owned electric utilities added
1952 -  Jurisdiction over investor-owned natural gas utilities and safety-only for municipally owned gas utilities added
1959 - Jurisdiction over privately owned water and wastewater companies added
1963 - Name changed to Florida Public Utilities Commission
1965 - Name changed to Florida Public Service Commission
1972 - Jurisdiction over airlines added
1974 - Rate structure jurisdiction over municipal and rural cooperative electric utilities added
1978 - Airlines were deregulated
1979 -  Commission composition changed from three elected to five appointed Commissioners
1980 -  Motor carriers were deregulated
1985 -  Railroads were deregulated
1986 -  Safety jurisdiction over all electric utilities added
1992 -  Jurisdiction over intrastate natural gas pipelines added
1995 -  Legislature opened up local telecommunications market to increased competition
2011 -  The FPSC jurisdiction over telecommunications was reduced

Structure 

The FPSC consists of five members with experience in fields include economics, accounting, engineering, finance, natural resource conservation, energy, public affairs, and law.

The Governor appoints the commissioners, who are then confirmed by the Florida Senate.  Commissioners serve  four year terms without term limits.  Prior to 1979, three Commissioners were elected in a statewide election.  The 1978 Legislature changed the FPSC to a five-member appointed board.

The chair is the chief administrative officer of the FPSC, presiding at all hearings and conferences when present, setting FPSC hearings, and performing those duties prescribed by law.  The chair is elected by the FPSC.

FPSC Commissioners 
Andrew Giles Fay was appointed to the Commission by Governor Rick Scott in February 2018. He was reappointed to the FPSC by Governor Ron DeSantis through January 1, 2026. Fay was elected Chair from January 2022 through January 2024.

Art Graham was appointed to the FPSC in July 2010.  He has been reappointed three times, most recently for a term through January 1, 2026. He was elected to serve as Commission Chair three times.

Gary F. Clark was reappointed to the FPSC by Governor Rick Scott for a term beginning on January 1, 2023.  He was first appointed to the Commission in 2017. Clark was elected to serve as Chair from January 2020 through January 2022. 

Mike La Rosa was appointed by Governor Ron DeSantis to the FPSC for a four-year term beginning January 2, 2021.

Gabriella Passidomo was reappointed to the Commission by Governor Ron DeSantis for a four-year term beginning January 1, 2023. She was first appointed to the FPSC in 2021 to fill a vacant seat.

Jurisdiction 

The Florida Legislature established the powers and responsibilities of the FPSC as a regulator of public utilities under its jurisdiction. This includes electric, natural gas, telephone, water, and wastewater.  the FPSC exercises the following regulator authority:

 Rate base/economic regulation - analyzing requested rate changes and conducting earnings surveillance to ensure that regulated utilities are not exceeding their authorized rates of return.
 Competitive market oversight - facilitating the development of competitive markets and issues associated with them.
 Safety, reliability, and service-monitoring - promoting an uninterrupted supply of utility services to the general public, and confirms that such services are provided in a reasonable and timely manner with minimal risks.

In 2022, the FPSC regulated 5 investor-owned electric companies, 8 investor-owned natural gas utilities, and 149 investor-owned water and/or wastewater utilities.  The FPSC also had competitive market oversight for 286 telecommunications companies in Florida.

The FPSC does not regulate the rates and service quality of publicly owned municipal or cooperative electric utilities; however, the FPSC does have jurisdiction regarding rate structure, territorial boundaries, bulk power supply operations, and power supply planning over 35 municipally owned electric systems and 18 rural electric cooperatives. The FPSC has jurisdiction regarding territorial boundaries and safety, over 27 municipally owned natural gas utilities and 4 gas districts. In addition, the Commission exercises safety authority over all electric and natural gas systems operating in the state.

Consumer Information 

The FPSC participates in consumer forums, community meetings, customer meetings and hearings, and consumer publications.  The FPSC participates in consumer programs and distributes conservation-related materials through partnerships with governmental entities, and consumer groups.

Each year, the FPSC provides educational brochures to Florida public libraries for consumer distribution. The Commission has recently increased its Library Outreach Campaign participants to educate consumers across the state. Through the program, a variety of FPSC publications highlighting practical energy and water conservation measures are distributed to library patrons throughout the year.

Events to promote energy efficiency and conservation education are annually observed during October's Energy Action Month, sponsored annually by the U.S. Department of Energy.

National Consumer Protection Week observed each year in March, highlights consumer protection and education efforts around the country, and is important to the FPSC's conservation education efforts.

Lifeline assistance

The Florida Lifeline program is part of the federal Universal Service Program (USP) designed to enable low-income households to obtain and maintain basic local telephone service.  The Lifeline program offers qualifying households a minimum $9.25 discount on their monthly phone bills, or a free Lifeline cell phone and monthly minutes from certain wireless providers.

Dozens of  local, state, and federal agencies, organizations and businesses, and telecommunications companies were involved in the collaborative effort to increase awareness and participation in the Lifeline program in 2022. Promotional activities in 2022 featured National Consumer Protection Week and ongoing efforts to increase awareness and enrollment in the Lifeline program. Each month, the FPSC sends a cover letter and informational packet to two organizations to encourage continued Lifeline outreach to their eligible clientele. In addition, the FPSC attends as least two community events each month to promote Lifeline.

As of June 2022, 300,285 eligible customers participated in the Florida Lifeline program. The five companies with the highest Lifeline enrollment in Florida were SafeLink Wireless, Assurance Wireless, Access Wireless, T-Mobile, and CenturyLink with 99 percent of the Florida Lifeline customers.

Florida Relay Service

The FPSC oversees the administration of a statewide telecommunications access system to provide access to Telecommunications Relay Services by persons who are deaf, hard of hearing or speech impaired, or others who communicate with them.

In 2021, the Commission opened a docket to request proposals from companies to provide relay service in Florida beginning in March 2022. Two companies filed proposals, Hamilton Relay and Sprint Communications Company, L.P. (Sprint). After reviewing the technical, financial, and price elements of each proposal, the Commission selected Sprint Communications Company, L.P.'s (Sprint's) proposal on October 12, 2021. Sprint's relay contract to provide telecommunications relay service to the hard-of-hearing, deaf, deaf/blind, and speech impaired Floridians is for a period of three years beginning on March 1, 2022. The contract contains extension options for four additional one-year periods.

See also
Public Utilities Commission

References 

Official website
Inside the PSC 2015 
Statement of Agency Organization & Operations (January 2015)

Florida
State agencies of Florida
1887 establishments in Florida